Palais Esterházy is a baroque palace in Vienna, Austria, owned by the noble Esterházy family. It houses a famous and popular restaurant in the former wine cellars, called Esterházykeller.

The Palace is one of two with the same name in Vienna. This particular Palais Esterházy is on Wallnerstraße (the other one is on Kärntner Straße). At one time there were 14 different properties on this site. The first prince began building between 1685 and 1695. It was between 1806 and 1820 that it got the appearance we know today. In the 20th century, the family hardly used it. After renovations in the post World War II period, most parts were leased out.

See also
 Palais Harrach
 List of restaurants in Vienna

References

Esterházy family
Buildings and structures in Innere Stadt
Esterhazy
Restaurants in Vienna